Major Andrew Green Thompson (1820 – 26 April 1889) was a British Conservative Party politician.

Green Thompson was elected MP for Cockermouth at a by-election in April 1868, but stood down shortly after at the next general election in November 1868.

References

External links
 

Conservative Party (UK) MPs for English constituencies
UK MPs 1865–1868
1820 births
1889 deaths